Aurora is a center of media in north-central Colorado. The following is a list of media outlets based in the city.

Print

Newspapers
The Aurora Sentinel is the city's primary newspaper, published weekly. Given Aurora's proximity to Denver, local readers can also purchase the daily print edition of The Denver Post.

Other newspapers published in Aurora include:
Buckley Guardian, Buckley Air Force Base news
Denver Urban Spectrum, African American news, monthly
El Hispano, Spanish language newspaper, weekly

Radio
Aurora is in the Denver-Boulder radio market. Local listeners can also receive the signal of radio stations broadcasting from nearby communities including Centennial, Colorado Springs, Greenwood Village, Longmont, and Loveland.

The following is a list of radio stations that broadcast from or are licensed to Aurora.

AM

FM

Television
Aurora is in the Denver television market. In addition, local viewers can receive the signal of television stations broadcasting from nearby communities including Fort Collins and Greeley.

The following is a list of television stations that broadcast from and/or are licensed to Aurora.

References

Aurora, Colorado
Aurora